Iron Skillet may refer to:

 Frying pan
 Iron Skillet (trophy), the trophy awarded to the victor of the SMU–TCU football rivalry
 Iron Skillet (restaurant), an American restaurant chain attached to Petro Stopping Centers